Arizona Bad Man is a 1935 American Western film directed by S. Roy Luby and starring Reb Russell, Lois January and Edmund Cobb.

Cast
 Reb Russell as Steve Donovan
 Lois January as Lucy Dunston
 Slim Whitaker as Black Bart Dunston
 Edmund Cobb as Sonny Karns - Gunman
 Dick Botiller as Pedro Gonzales - Bart's Henchman
 Tommy Bupp as Dave Dunston
 Anne Howard as Min - Middle-Aged Dancer 
 Walter James as Jack - Bartender
 Fay McKenzie as Girl at Barn Dance

References

Bibliography
 Rainey, Buck. Sweethearts of the Sage: Biographies and Filmographies of 258 actresses appearing in Western movies. McFarland & Company, 1992.

External links
 

1935 films
1935 Western (genre) films
American Western (genre) films
Films directed by S. Roy Luby
American black-and-white films
1930s English-language films
1930s American films